The play-offs of the 2018 Fed Cup Europe/Africa Zone Group II were the final stages of the Group II zonal competition involving teams from Europe and Africa. Using the positions determined in their pools, the eight teams faced off to determine their placing in the 2018 Fed Cup Europe/Africa Zone Group II. The top two teams advanced to Group I, and the bottom two teams were relegated down to the Group III for the next year.

Promotional play-offs 
The first-placed teams of each pool played against the second-placed teams of the other pool in head-to-head rounds. The winner of each round advanced to the 2019 Europe/Africa Zone Group I.

Greece vs. Luxembourg

Denmark vs. Israel

Relegation play-offs 
The third-placed teams of the pools played against each other in a head-to-head round. The loser was relegated to the 2019 Europe/Africa Zone Group III alongside Norway who finished last in Pool B.

Egypt vs. Bosnia and Herzegovina

Final placements 

References

External links 
 Fed Cup website

2018 Fed Cup Europe/Africa Zone